The 1962 Lafayette Leopards football team was an American football team that represented Lafayette College during the 1962 NCAA College Division football season. Lafayette tied for second-to-last in the Middle Atlantic Conference, University Division, and finished last in the Middle Three Conference.

In their fifth and final year under head coach James McConlogue, the Leopards compiled a 3–6 record. Martin Shane was the team captain.

With a 2–4 record against MAC University Division opponents, Lafayette tied with Gettysburg for fifth place in the seven-team circuit. The Leopards went 0–2 against the Middle Three, losing to both Lehigh and Rutgers.

Lafayette played its home games at Fisher Field on College Hill in Easton, Pennsylvania.

Schedule

References

Lafayette
Lafayette
Lafayette Leopards football seasons
Lafayette Leopards football